Oprah Prime is an American primetime television series hosted and produced by Oprah Winfrey, airing on the Oprah Winfrey Network. It was originally called Oprah's Next Chapter up until season 3 when it was renamed to Oprah Prime.

Overview

{| class="wikitable plainrowheaders" style="text-align:center;"
|-
! colspan="2" rowspan="2" |Season
! rowspan="2" |Episodes
! colspan="2" |Originally aired
|-
! First aired
! Last aired
|-
! style="background:#1bbed3;"| 
| 1
| 29
| 
| 
|-
! style="background:#A61C5F"| 
| 2
| 47
|
| 
|-
! style="background:#3CB371"| 
| 3
| 9
|
|
|-
|}

Episodes

Season 1 (2012)
The first season of Oprah Prime premiered on January 1, 2012, and ran for 29 episodes.

Season 2 (2012-13)
The second season of Oprah Prime premiered on July 22, 2012.

Season 3 (2014-15)

References

Oprahs Next Chapter